Tibrela is a town in the Nandiala Department of Boulkiemdé Province in central western Burkina Faso. It has a population of 3,235.

References

Populated places in Boulkiemdé Province